Vampire Expert is 1995 Hong Kong television series produced by ATV and starring Lam Ching-ying. The two-season series served as a transition from film to television for the 1980s Hong Kong Chinese vampire film franchise. A third season was planned, but due to the poor health and subsequent death of lead actor Lam Ching-ying, the series was cancelled in 1996.

Synopsis
Taoist priest Mo Siu-fong (Lam Ching-ying) and his apprentice Ma Fan (Yung Kam-cheong) travel to Hong Kong in pursuit of an ancient vampire.

Cast
Lam Ching-ying as Mo Siu-fong
Kingdom Yuen as Zung Gwan
Yung Kam-cheong as Ma Fan (Season 1)
Frankie Lam as Mo's apprentice (Season 2)
Mang Hoi as Mo's apprentice (Season 2)

Development
Following the popularity of various Chinese vampire films in the 1980s, Hong Kong television network ATV World made plans to create a similar television series starring Lam Ching-ying, who was a familiar face in the genre and often typecast. Lam signed on to the film for HK$1 million, and filming started in early 1996.

Number of episodes

References

External links
 Vampire Expert Series 1 - iQiyi (Chinese)
 Vampire Expert Series 2 - iQiyi (Chinese)
 僵尸道长 at Mtime
 Vampire Expert Episode Guide

1995 Hong Kong television series debuts
1996 Hong Kong television series endings
1990s Hong Kong television series
Cantonese-language television shows
Asia Television original programming